Wildwood is an unincorporated community in Lewis County, in the U.S. state of Washington. The town is located between Boistfort and Vader. The community's early days, similar to other areas in Lewis County, had an economy driven by lumber production however it has retained its predominant agricultural roots. The area is known for its elk hunting.

History
Wildwood was first settled by non-Native people in 1881. A post office called Wildwood was established in 1889 and remained in operation until 1930. The moniker was chosen as it was descriptive of the original condition of the town site. A small school existed for a brief time in the 1910s and 1920s.

References

Populated places in Lewis County, Washington
Unincorporated communities in Lewis County, Washington
Unincorporated communities in Washington (state)